

The Trotskyist Fraction – Fourth International is a political international of Trotskyist political organizations that claim to adhere to the political legacy of the Fourth International. It was formed by groups which arose as the "Internationalist Bolshevik Faction" within the International Workers League (IWL-FI) in 1989. Regarded at first as an "external fraction" who had been wrongly expelled, from 1988 to 1990 the Argentinian Socialist Workers' Party (PTS) had three splits: first when a number of militants returned to the Argentinian Movement for Socialism (MAS) party, then when another group of militants sympathized with the British Workers Revolutionary Party (Worker Press) and the third when supporters of León Pérez (former member of the International Secretariat of the International Workers League) decided to follow a mass party perspective (as opposed to a vanguard party).

These splits forced the PTS to make a balance and self-criticism, resulting in a further development that mainly questioned the update of the Transitional Program (the so-called the "Theory of Democratic Revolution") that the leader of the International Workers League Nahuel Moreno made, understanding it as an opposition to Leon Trotsky's Theory of Permanent Revolution.

In 1998 it emerged as the Trotskyist Fraction - International Strategy, founded by the PTS of Argentina, the LTS of Mexico, the LOR of Bolivia and with the endorsements of the Estratégia Revolucionaria (Revolutionary Strategy) group of Brazil and the Clase contra Clase (Class against Class) group of Chile as well as some militant sympathizers in Europe. In 2004, in its second international conference, coinciding with the congress of the Movement for the Refoundation of the Fourth International which also met in Buenos Aires, the TF decided to change the name "International Strategy" to "Fourth International". Following the economic crisis and demonstrations in several countries, the TF-FI has grown in Latin America and Europe and now promotes the formation of a new grouping: An International Movement for a Socialist Revolution - Fourth International, which had its manifesto updated in 2017 and 2018 due to new developments in the international arena.

National sections

Former sections:

  Groupe Communiste Revolutionaire Internationaliste (Revolutionary Internationalist Communist Group) (CRI) - They were admitted in 2008 as sympathiser section, but after the creation of the New Anticapitalist Party they decided to dissolve within the CLAIRE Tendency (acronym for "Tendency for Communism and self-organized, internationalist and revolutionary struggle").
  Socialist Revolution League (Liga de la Revolución Socialista) (LRS) - Admitted in 2008 as full section, but they dissolved in 2014.

See also
List of Trotskyist internationals

References

External links

 Trotskyist Fraction